Laurel Mountain is a peak in Mono County, California. It lies in the Sherwin Range of the Sierra Nevada and is in the Inyo National Forest and the John Muir Wilderness.

References

External links
 
 

Mountains of the John Muir Wilderness
Mountains of Mono County, California
Mountains of Northern California